Life... Is for Living is the fourth studio album by Sherbet released in November 1975. The album reached at number 3 on the Kent Music Report.

Track listing

Personnel

"Survival"
Garth Porter – clavinet, Hammond organ, Moog, Yamaha combo organ
Clive Shakespeare – guitars
Tony Mitchell – bass guitar
Alan Sandow – drums

"Life"
Daryl Braithwaite – lead vocals
Garth Porter – mutron, clavinet, Moog, organ, harmony vocals
Clive Shakespeare – electric guitar, acoustic classical guitar, harmony vocals
Tony Mitchell – bass guitar, harmony vocals
Alan Sandow – drums, roto-toms

"I Wanna Live"
Daryl Braithwaite – lead vocals
Garth Porter – organ, clavinet, saxophones, harmony vocals
Clive Shakespeare – slide guitars, acoustic guitars, Burns Flyte guitars, harmony vocals
Tony Mitchell – bass guitar, harmony vocals
Alan Sandow – drums, roto-toms, percussion
Dalvanius and The Fascinations – harmony vocals

"Only One You"
Daryl Braithwaite – lead vocals
Garth Porter – Hammond organs, Yamaha organs, piano, string synthesizer, harmony vocals 
Clive Shakespeare – classical guitars, 12 string guitars, harmony vocals
Tony Mitchell – bass guitar, harmony vocals
Alan Sandow – drums
Bruce Sandell – flute

"Matter of Time"
Garth Porter – lead vocals, saxophones, piano
Clive Shakespeare – electric guitar
Tony Mitchell – bass guitar
Alan Sandow – drums
Daryl Braithwaite – Burns Flyte guitar
Geoff Oakes – saxophone solo

"Just Being You"
Daryl Braithwaite – lead vocals, tambourine
Garth Porter – clavinet, piano, saxes, harmony vocals
Clive Shakespeare – lead guitar, Uni-Vibe guitars, 12 string guitars, Burns Flyte guitars
Tony Mitchell – bass guitar, harmony vocals
Alan Sandow – drums
Dal & Fascinations – vocals

"Bluesong"
Tony Mitchell – bass guitar, lead vocals
Garth Porter – Wurlitzer piano
Clive Shakespeare – guitars, harmony vocals
Alan Sandow – drums, gon bop congas
Peter Jones – vibes

"I've Been In It Too Long"
Daryl Braithwaite – vocals
Garth Porter – lead vocals on 2nd verse, piano, saxophones
Clive Shakespeare – ukulele, vocals, harp, kitchen sink
Tony Mitchell – bass guitar, vocals
Alan Sandow – lead vocals on 1st verse, drums

"Where Do We Go?"
Daryl Braithwaite – lead vocals, tambourine
Garth Porter – electric piano, grand piano, organ, saxophones, harmony vocals
Clive Shakespeare – 12 string guitar, slide guitars, Burns Flyte guitar, harmony vocals
Tony Mitchell – bass guitar, harmony vocals
Alan Sandow – drums, harmony vocals
Dal & The Fascinations – harmony vocals
David Bronn – saxophone
Miguel Carranza – trombone
Bruce Sandell – flute
Russell Smith – trumpet

"Survival (Reprise)"
Daryl Braithwaite – vocals
Garth Porter – electric piano, synthesizers, strings, Yamaha combo organ
Clive Shakespeare – electric guitars, acoustic guitars
Tony Mitchell – bass guitar
Alan Sandow – drums
Russell Smith – trumpet

Charts

Release history

References

Sherbet (band) albums
1975 albums
Festival Records albums
Infinity Records albums
Albums produced by Clive Shakespeare
Albums produced by John L Sayers
Albums produced by Garth Porter